The 2022 Fanatec FIA Motorsport Games Esports Cup was the second FIA Motorsport Games Digital Cup, to be held at Circuit Paul Ricard, France on 26 October to 30 October 2022. The race was contested with GT3-spec cars. The event is the part of the 2022 FIA Motorsport Games.

Entry list

Results

General Qualifying

Quarter-finals
The competition consists of 3 Quarter-finals, the Top 10 of each Quarter-final proceed to the Semi-finals, while Places 11 to 19 get transferred to the "Last Chance" Qualifier stage. 
      Proceeds to the Semi-finals

Quarter-final 1

Notes
  – Driver #24 had 5 seconds added to their race time for crossing the pit entry line

Quarter-final 2

Quarter-final 3

Last Chance
After the completition of all the Quarter-finals positions 11 to 19 get another chance in two Last Chance races. The Top 5 of each race advance to the Semi-finals, the rest are eliminated. 
      Proceeds to the Semi-finals 
      Eliminated

Last Chance 1

Notes
  – The driver of car #11 has had 5 seconds added to their total race time
  – The driver of car #05 has had 10 seconds added to their total race time
  – The driver of car #37 has had 5 seconds added to their race time
  – The driver of car #24 has had 5 seconds added to their total race time

Last Chance 2

Semi-final
The Top 10 of each Semi-final advance to the Final, the rest are eliminated. 
      Proceeds to the final 
      Eliminated

Semi-final 1

Notes
  – The driver of car #22 has had 5 seconds added to their total race time
  – The driver of car #21 has had 5 seconds added to their total race time
  – The driver of car #52 has had 1 second added to their total race time
  – The driver of car #11 has been disqualified from the race

Semi-final 2

Notes
  – The driver of car #27 has had 5 seconds added to their total race time 
  – The driver of car #23 has had 5 seconds added to their total race time

Final

Notes
  – The driver of car #12 has been disqualified from the race

References

External links

Esports Cup
2022 in esports